The State Correctional Institution – Greene (SCI Greene) is a maximum security prison, classified as a Supermax, located in Franklin Township, Greene County, Pennsylvania, near Waynesburg, off Interstate 79 and Pennsylvania Route 21. Pennsylvania Department of Corrections operates the prison, which houses most of Pennsylvania's capital case inmates.

It is in the far southwest of the state, near the border with West Virginia, in a rural area.

History
SCI Greene opened in late 1993.

Around 1996, some prisoners stated that some guards used more force than necessary to control them, and a video camera had captured evidence related to the complaint. Charles Graner, a prison guard who began working at SCI Greene in 1996, was the defendant in two lawsuits, each by a different prisoner; both lawsuits were dismissed as one disappeared after finishing his sentence and the other had submitted his lawsuit after a deadline. Graner later became known for the Abu Ghraib scandal.

Facility and operations
The prison had 11 cell blocks.  SCI Greene had 1,750 prisoners and 720 employees. The death row prisoners are in blocks G and L; they normally stay in their cells but may go to a recreational area and the library. Greene was built with the newest features at the time, including central air conditioning.

The prison had cable television installed at the time of its opening.

Demographics
, SCI Greene had 157 death row prisoners, about 75% of the prisoners under Pennsylvania state death sentences.

Notable inmates
Life imprisonment:
 Cosmo DiNardo, convicted of four murders in Bucks County in 2017.
 Ben Birdwell, one of the murderers of the Freeman family.
 Russell Maroon Shoatz, convicted in the murder of Police sergeant Francis Von Colln. Founder of Black United Movement in Philadelphia; former member of the Black Panther Party and the Black Liberation Army.

Other imprisonment
 Jerry Sandusky
 Robert Loren Masters, Jr, one of the murderers of Jennifer Daugherty.

Death row:
 Christopher Roney (alias Cool C), hip hop artist, convicted in the murder of Philadelphia Police Department officer Lauretha Vaird in a bank robbery.
 Harvey Miguel Robinson, serial killer moved to State Correctional Institution – Phoenix in 2018.
 Ricky Smyrnes, one of the murderers of Jennifer Daugherty, since moved to Correctional Institution – Phoenix.

Notable staff
 Charles Graner (began in 1996, later became an Abu Ghraib military prison guard)

See also

 List of Pennsylvania state prisons

References

External links
"SCI Greene." Pennsylvania Department of Corrections.
 Abuses at SCI Greene SuperMax
 http://articles.mcall.com/2012-08-04/news/mc-pennsylvania-death-row-tour-20120804_1_solitary-confinement-junius-burno-death-row

Greene
Greene
Buildings and structures in Greene County, Pennsylvania
1993 establishments in Pennsylvania